Nancy N. Roberts is a translator of Arabic literature. She won the University of Arkansas Translation Award for her translation of Ghada Samman's Beirut '75. She also received a commendation from the judges of the 2008 Banipal Prize for her translation of Salwa Bakr's The Man from Bashmour.

Early life and education
She was born and raised in Wichita, Kansas. She completed her undergraduate studies in Psychology and religious studies at Western Kentucky University. Then she did a graduate degree in M.S.Applied linguistics from Indiana University Bloomington and went abroad. She lived in Lebanon for one year and five years in Kuwait and returned for about 7 years and she did M.A.Arabic language and Literature at Indiana University. She settled in Jordan and lived there from 1995 until 2015.

Career

Indiana University-Bloomington, associate instructor in English, 1980-81.
American University of Beirut, Lebanon, instructor in English, 1981-82.
Kuwait University, Kuwait City, instructor of English in College of Commerce, 1982-87.
Earlham College, Richmond, IN, instructor in English as a second language, 1988-90.
Indiana University-Bloomington, instructor in Arabic, 1991-93.
AL al-Bayt University, Mafraq, Jordan, instructor in English as a second language, 1994-97.
Federal Broadcasting Information Service, Jordan Bureau, translator, 1998-99.
Free-lance translator, Amman, Jordan, 1999-.
Mitchell Translations, translator from Arabic to English, 1994.

Works
Selected Translations:

 Beirut ’75 by Ghada al-Samman 
 Beirut Nightmares by Ghada al-Samman
 The Night of the First Billion by Ghada al-Samman
 Muntaha by Hala El-Badry
 Time of White Horses by Ibrahim Nasrallah
 Over the Bridge by Mohamed el-Bisatie
 Love in the Rain by Naguib Mahfouz
 The Mirage by Naguib Mahfouz 
 The Man from Bashmour by Salwa Bakr
 House of the Wolf by Ezzat el Kamhawi

Roberts has also translated works on Islamic history, jurisprudence and Sufism. These include:
 The Jurisprudence of the Prophetic Biography, a translation of Fiqh al-Sirah al-Nabawiyyah (فقه السيرة النبوية) by Muhammad Sa'id Ramadan al-Buti 
 Islamic Jurisprudence According to the Four Sunni Schools, Volume I: Modes of Islamic Worship  by Abd al-Rahman Ibn Muhammad Awad al-Jaziri
 Apostasy in Islam by Taha Jabir Alalwani

See also
 List of Arabic-English translators

References

Arabic–English translators
Living people
1957 births